Rudolf Zajac (born 9 February 1951) is a former Minister of Health of Slovakia in the government of Prime Minister Mikuláš Dzurinda, in office 2002 to 2006. He is well known for his radical and unpopular reform of health care in Slovakia. Nowadays he is in political retirement, but he has joined think-tanks mostly involved in health care issues.

References 

1951 births
Living people
Politicians from Bratislava
Health ministers of Slovakia
Civic Conservative Party (Slovakia) politicians
Idea (political party) politicians